The black lancer (Bagrichthys macracanthus) is a species of bagrid catfish found in Cambodia, Indonesia, Laos, Malaysia and Thailand.  It grows to a length of 25.0 cm.

It is the only species of the genus Bagrichthys that is traded for the aquarium hobby. When these fish are first imported, they are often young and in bad condition. It has been recommended to acclimate these fish at a high temperature (about 29 °C or 85 °F). Though nocturnal, this species may be trained to eat in the light; it may even be trained to feed from the owner's hand. These fish tend to be territorial among their own kinds though this behavior can be reduced by placing a male with multiple females. This species is quite adaptable with pH and DH and will thrive as long as extremes are avoided.

References 
 

Bagridae
Fish of Asia
Freshwater fish of Indonesia
Freshwater fish of Malaysia
Fish of Thailand
Fish described in 1854